Fanzhuang is a town of Zhao County, Hebei province, China, located  east of the county seat. , it has 36 villages under its administration.

Notable people
 Daniel C. Tsui, Chinese-American physicist

See also
List of township-level divisions of Hebei

References

Township-level divisions of Hebei